Marc Ernest Elisabeth Robert Juliette Verwilghen, born 21 September 1952 in Dendermonde, is a Belgian politician.

Verwilghen studied law at the Vrije Universiteit Brussel and the University of Ghent and is the holder of an honorary doctorate from Ghent. 

A member of the Flemish Liberals and Democrats (VLD), he was elected to the Belgian Chamber of Representatives in 1991 and 1995, and in 1999, to the Belgian Senate. In the Chamber he served as chairman of the Justice committee, and headed two special investigative committees into the events surrounding Marc Dutroux.

He served as Justice minister from 1999 to 2003, as Development co-operation minister 2003–2004, and then as Minister of Economy (fully: Economy, Small and Medium Enterprises, the Middle Classes, Energy, Overseas Trade and Science) from 2004.

He was elected as a member of the Belgian Senate in 2007.

Honours 
2010 : Grand Officer in the Order of Leopold.

Notes

Living people
1952 births
Open Vlaamse Liberalen en Democraten politicians
Members of the Belgian Federal Parliament
Ghent University alumni